Imaginary Cities is a 2015 studio album by American jazz saxophonist Chris Potter, his second released on the ECM label. Featuring the return of his ‘Underground’ quartet with keyboardist Craig Taborn, guitarist Adam Rogers and drummer Nate Smith along with vibraphonist Steve Nelson, bassist Scott Colley, bass guitarist Fima Ephron and a string quartet.

Reception

The Allmusic review by Thom Jurek awarded the album 4 stars stating "Potter's writing on Imaginary Cities engages every aspect of his jazz palette. It embraces modern classical music as part of a striking whole. It is his most ambitious project to date, and arguably his most expertly articulated".

The Guardian 's John Fordham noted "this feels like a work in progress with a fascinating future". Jeff Simon writing for The Buffalo News commented, "The result is utterly spectacular, I think. It’s a disc that it is completely fresh and idiomatically only itself, with great solos all through it, not least of all by Potter on tenor and soprano saxophone and bass clarinet."

All About Jazz correspondent John Kelman observed "with Imaginary Cities Potter has created the first real masterpiece of 2015. A profound paradigm shift for the saxophonist, Imaginary Cities suggests that the end point of Potter's potential seems still very far beyond the horizon". Another review by Karl Ackermann stated "Imaginary Cities is an expansive album expressing divergent motifs linked together through a central theme. The septet is taut and adventurous; the strings impassioned and thoughtful and Potter's playing is his best to date. Though he emerged as a leader two decades back seemingly fully-formed in every creative aspect, he continues to evolve and surprise. Imaginary Cities is a superb album on every level".

Track listing
All compositions by Chris Potter
 "Lament" − 8:07
 "Imaginary Cities 1: Compassion" − 8:34
 "Imaginary Cities 2: Dualities" − 8:44
 "Imaginary Cities 3: Disintegration" − 7:23
 "Imaginary Cities 4: Rebuilding" − 11:33
 "Firefly" − 8:37
 "Shadow Self" − 6:09
 "Sky" − 12:02

Personnel
Chris Potter - soprano saxophone, tenor saxophone, bass clarinet
Adam Rogers − guitars 
Craig Taborn − piano
Steve Nelson − vibraphone, marimba
Fima Ephron − bass guitar
Scott Colley − double bass
Nate Smith - drums
Mark Feldman, Joyce Hammann − violin
Lois Martin − viola
Dave Eggar − cello

References

Chris Potter (jazz saxophonist) albums
2015 albums
ECM Records albums
Albums produced by Manfred Eicher